The International Committee of Children's and Adolescents' Movements (ICCAM), generally known by its French name, Comité international des mouvements d'enfants et d'adolescents and acronym CIMEA, is an international pioneer movement organization. CIMEA is a substructure of the World Federation of Democratic Youth (WFDY).

The history of CIMEA goes back to 15 February 1958, when a 'children bureau' was founded within WFDY in Budapest.  In 1962, a CIMEA was founded as a separate committee.

Members

CIMEA has members in 58 countries. Members include:

References

Pioneer movement
Youth organizations established in 1962
Youth wings of communist parties